Sheykh Saluy or Sheikh Salooy, also rendered as Shaikh Silu or Sheykh Salu or Sheykh Selu or Sheykh Solu, may refer to:
 Sheykh Saluy-e Olya
 Sheykh Saluy-e Sofla